Daejeon Korail FC is a South Korean football club based in Daejeon. The team currently plays in the K3 League, the third tier of South Korean football league system. It is owned and operated by Korea Railroad Corporation, South Korea's national railroad operator. Their home venue is Daejeon Hanbat Sports Complex.

History
After being founded in 1943 by the Chosen Government Railway as Chosen Government Railway FC (Korean: 조선총독부 철도국 축구단), the team competed in various semi-professional football competitions throughout decades until they joined the Korea National League in 2003.

In 1948, the club changed its name to Ministry of Transportation FC after Joseon Railways was absorbed into Ministry of Transportation by the South Korean government. 

The club was inactive during the Korean War and was re-established in 1961 or 1962. It was renamed National Railroad FC (Korean: 철도청 축구단) in 1963 and Korea Railroad FC (Korean: 한국철도 축구단) in 1995. In 2004, to comply with Korea National League's club naming policy, the club added the team's location to its name, changing the name to Incheon Korea Railroad FC (Korean: 인천 한국철도 축구단). After Korea National Railroad was renamed to Korail, the club's name was also changed again to Incheon Korail FC (Korean: 인천 코레일 축구단) during the 2007 season. At the end of the 2013 season, the club has been renamed to Daejeon Korail FC after the team's relocation from Incheon to Daejeon.

The team has played in the Korea National League between 2003 and 2019, when the league merged with the K3 League. They won the 2005 season with a 4–2 aggregate victory over Suwon City in the final. In the Korean FA Cup, the team reached the quarter-finals in 2001 and the semi-finals in 2005. In the 2019 edition, the team reached the final, where they lost 4–0 on aggregate to the top division side Suwon Samsung Bluewings.

Honours

League 
 National League
Winners (2): 2005, 2012
Runners-up (1): 2014

Cups 
 Korean FA Cup
Runners-up (1): 2019
 National League Championship
Winners (3): 2013, 2015, 2018
Runners-up (1): 2016
 National Sports Festival
Gold Medal (3): 2000, 2001, 2011
 National Football Championship
Runners-up (1): 2000
 President's Cup
Runners-up (1): 2004

Season-by-season records

Current squad
As of 1 July 2022.

References

External links
  at korail.com 

Korea (South)
Korea National League clubs
Sport in Daejeon
Association football clubs established in 1943
1943 establishments in Korea
Korail
K3 League clubs